Kim Bok-soon (Korean: 김복순,金福順 born 6 January 1950) is a North Korean speed skater. She represented her nation between 1968 and 1979 at international competitions.

Kim Bok-soon participated at the World Allround Speed Skating Championships for Women in 1968, finishing 29th overall. In April 1970 she started in two events at the 1970 Winter Universiade, with her best result in the 1500m finishing 5th. She competed in two events at the 1972 Winter Olympics. After no international competitions in the years after the Olympics, she competed at a friendly international competition in Zakopane, Poland in February 1979.

Records

Personal records

References

External links
 

1950 births
Living people
North Korean female speed skaters
Olympic speed skaters of North Korea
Speed skaters at the 1972 Winter Olympics
People from Musan County